Fabrizio Di Somma (born 15 January 1971) is a former Italian paralympic cyclist who won a three medals at the Summer Paralympics.

References

External links
 Fabrizio Di Somma at FCI

1971 births
Living people
Paralympic cyclists of Italy
Paralympic silver medalists for Italy
Paralympic bronze medalists for Italy
Medalists at the 2000 Summer Paralympics
Paralympic medalists in cycling
Cyclists at the 2000 Summer Paralympics
Cyclists at the 2004 Summer Paralympics
People from Latina, Lazio
Cyclists from Lazio
Sportspeople from the Province of Latina